Capra dalii is a fossil species of goat discovered in Georgia in 2006. It is named for the Georgian goddess Dali, who was considered the guardian of hoofed animals such as ibexes and goats. Fragments of C. dalii fossils were first located at the Dmanisi archaeological site, and are believed to be related to the west Caucasian tur, Capra caucasica. The species is believed to have existed during the Early Pleistocene, around 1.76 million years ago, making it the oldest known example of the Capra genus.

Based on the fossil fragments found, C. dalii is believed to have been a large Capra species, with horns that curved outward. Its teeth are similar to those of Hemitragus orientalis, another fossil species.

Some of the C. dalii fossil fragments are held in the National History collection at the Dmanisi Museum-Reserve, part of the Georgian National Museum.

References

Bibliography 
 
 
 

dalii
Mammals described in 2006
Pleistocene mammals of Europe
Prehistoric even-toed ungulate genera
Prehistoric caprids